Harry Potter and the Goblet of Fire is a 2005 action-adventure video game published by Electronic Arts. It is based on the 2005 film of the same name. 

The game was released for Game Boy Advance, GameCube, Microsoft Windows, Nintendo DS, PlayStation 2, Xbox, and PlayStation Portable. It received mixed reviews from critics, with reviewers enjoying the scope of the spells and gameplay, but being less impressed by the short length, and the lack of free roaming components found in previous installments.

Gameplay
The game follows the events and characters of novel, and film, with the player controlling Harry Potter (voiced by Daniel Larner), Hermione Granger (Harper Marshall), and Ron Weasley (Gregg Chillin). The game uses an improved version of the group casting mechanic found in Harry Potter and the Prisoner of Azkaban. Improved graphics mean the characters themselves more closely resemble their film counterparts than in previous games. Gameplay in the Goblet of Fire is much more action-orientated, which is a change from the puzzle and adventure elements found in previous games of the series.

The game is split up into particular levels, rather than freeroaming around Hogwarts castle like in earlier games. Levels are played from parts of the novel the game is based on, with levels ranging from the Quidditch World cup, the Prefect's bathroom, and the Herbology greenhouses; which can be entered from the in-game "pensieve". The game also features modes outside of combat, including broomstick flying, and underwater swimming.

In a first for the series, players can play the game with friends, and can combine their magic and spells to make them more powerful. Players can also capture moving beans using Accio and increase their power with collectors, creature, and character cards. The game is divided into several non-consecutive levels, some of which are locked at the beginning of the game until the player collects enough Triwizard Shields to unlock it.

Reception

Just like the previous Harry Potter game titles, Goblet of Fire has received mixed reviews, according to video game review aggregator Metacritic.  In Japan, where the GameCube and Nintendo DS were ported on November 26, 2005, Famitsu gave it a combined score of 28 out of 40 for the DS version; and 27 out of 40 for the GameCube version. Famitsu Cube + Advance gave both the DS and GameCube versions a score of 27 out of 40.

Detroit Free Press gave the GameCube version all four stars and said, "This is a masterful video game because it can be enjoyed on many levels. Younger players can simply explore this graphically rich Harry Potter world and succeed. Older players will enjoy manipulating the magic by choosing spells and skills and casting magic together with friends." However, The Sydney Morning Herald gave the game three stars out of five and stated that its highlight "is a brief but thrilling broomstick chase against a fire-breathing dragon. An underwater interlude is less successful, although it provides variety."

The PlayStation 2 version of The Goblet of Fire received a "Platinum" sales award from the Entertainment and Leisure Software Publishers Association (ELSPA), indicating sales of at least 300,000 copies in the United Kingdom.

Notes

References

External links
 
 
 

2005 video games
Action-adventure games
Cooperative video games
Video games about dragons
Electronic Arts games
Harry Potter 4
Video games based on adaptations
Game Boy Advance games
GameCube games
Nintendo DS games
PlayStation 2 games
PlayStation Portable games
RenderWare games
Video game sequels
Video games scored by Jeremy Soule
Video games developed in France
Video games developed in the United Kingdom
Video games set in castles
Video games set in England
Video games set in Scotland
Video games set in the 1990s
Video games set in 1994
Video games set in 1995
Warner Bros. video games
Windows games
Xbox games
Video games using Havok
Magic Pockets games
Multiplayer and single-player video games